Kal Duzakh or Kalduzakh may refer to:
 Kal Duzakh 1
 Kal Duzakh 2